Mornick is a hamlet in the parish of South Hill, Cornwall, England.

References

Hamlets in Cornwall